The 1950–51 SK Rapid Wien season was the 53rd season in club history.

Squad

Squad and statistics

Squad statistics

Fixtures and results

League

Zentropa Cup

References

1950-51 Rapid Wien Season
Rapid
Austrian football championship-winning seasons